The Ninth Ward School disaster occurred on November 20, 1851, at Ward School No. 26 on Greenwich Street in New York City. While classes were in session, panic suddenly arose among the teachers and students about a possible fire in the building. Forty-three students died, mostly due to suffocation. An investigation determined that the students' escape had been slowed by inward-swinging exit doors and that the construction of the staircase bannister was insufficient to support to the weight of the students. While a coroner's jury found no fault in the accident, it recommended that all schools be built with fire-protected stairways and outward-opening exit doors.

References

1902 in New York City
Disasters in New York City
Human stampedes in the United States
History of New York City
1851 disasters in the United States
November 1851 events